OpenStax CNX, formerly called Connexions, is a global repository of educational content provided by volunteers. The open source platform is provided and maintained by OpenStax, which is based at Rice University.  The collection is available free of charge, can be remixed and edited, and is available for download in various digital formats.

Founded as Connexions in 1999 by Richard Baraniuk, OpenStax CNX is based on the philosophy that scholarly and educational content can and should be shared, re-used and recombined, interconnected and continually enriched. As such, it was one of the first Open Educational Resources (OER) initiatives along with projects such as MIT OpenCourseWare and the Public Library of Science. The materials in Connexions are available under a CC BY Creative Commons license, which means that content can be used, adapted, and remixed, as long as attribution is provided.

Subject matter
OpenStax CNX contains educational materials at all levels—from children to college students to professionals—organized in small modules (pages) that can be connected into larger collections (books). Material is authored by people from all walks of life. Much content is created by university professors, but the collection also contains very popular music content created by a part-time music teacher.

OpenStax CNX material is translated into many languages, aided by the open-content licensing.

Copyright
To ensure the legal reusability of content, OpenStax CNX requires authors to license materials they publish under the Creative Commons Attribution License (presently, version 4.0).  Under this license, the author retains the right to be credited (attributed) wherever the content is reused.  The author grants others the right to copy, distribute, and display the work, and to derive works based on it, as long as the author is credited.

Features of OpenStax CNX

OpenStax CNX has content from all over the world in a growing variety of languages, not just materials from one specific school or university. It also collects materials to support education in K-12, community college, university, continuing education, and industrial training settings.
OpenStax CNX is globally accessible to anyone to not only read and use the materials, but also take them, customize them, and contribute them back to the repository or not.
OpenStax CNX is a grassroots organized from the bottom up rather than from the top down like many other open education projects. Everyone is free to join and take on a leadership role.

Technical details
Three key factors enable the collaborative environment in OpenStax CNX:
Copyright licenses that preserve attribution but permit sharing: Creative Commons "attribution" licenses
Semantic markup of documents using XML (extensible markup language) so they can be searched for and combined. The markup language used is called "CNXML".
Workspaces that facilitate collaboration by providing shared space, the ability to version materials and derive content from existing modules.

Funding
The Connexions project was started in 1999 and initially supported by individuals and Rice University. That support has been substantially supplemented by grants from the William and Flora Hewlett Foundation.

See also
 OpenStax, a library of free, peer-reviewed, and openly licensed college textbooks
 Creative Commons, the organization that created the licenses used by OpenStax CNX
 Open educational resources, the idea that educational resources can be shared in general through copyleft or other free culture movement licenses
 OpenCourseWare
 Open textbook
 Bookboon
 China Open Resources for Education
 Curriki
 Flat World Knowledge
 Flexbook
 Free High School Science Texts South Africa
 Khan Academy
 MIT OpenCourseWare
 National Programme on Technology Enhanced Learning India
 Open.Michigan
 Wikiversity, a Wikimedia Foundation project, devoted to learning materials and activities

Notes

External links

 OpenStax CNX homepage, cnx.org
 TED Talk Founder Richard Baraniuk discussing Connexions in February 2006

American educational websites
Rice University
Open educational resources